"Crazy" is a song written and produced by the Americans songwriters and music producers John V. Anderson, Steve Williams and Steve Horton. The song was recorded in 1983 by popular American R&B vocal group The Manhattans and released the same year on the album Forever by Your Side by Columbia Records. "Crazy" was released as a single in June 1983, reaching No. 4 on the R&B chart, and No. 72 on the Billboard Hot 100. Besides the United States, "Crazy" peaked at No. 63 on the UK Singles chart. Two formats were released for the single of "Crazy". The first was 7" single, where "Crazy" was only 3:55 in length and containing the song "Love Is Gonna Find You" on B-side. The second was 12" single, containing the instrumental version of "Crazy" on B-side.

"Crazy" was followed later in 1983 by a second single, the title track "Forever by Your Side", which was successful in Brazil in 1985.

Chart positions

Weekly charts

Year-end charts

Track listing

7" Single

The full length of "Crazy" on the album Forever by Your Side is 4:52. The length of 3:55 on the 7" single is an edited version of the song.

12" Single

The instrumental version of "Crazy" present on the B-side of the 12" single was not included in the original 1983 LP Forever by Your Side.

Music video
"Crazy" has an official music video, recorded by The Manhattans in 1983. The video shows New York City and its buildings at night, the city illuminated by lights. The Manhattans sing "Crazy" in a club, wearing white suits and black pants, making gestures and dancing to the choreography of the song. The video also shows images of couples and at a later time, four women appear dancing on the stage where the Manhattans sing.

B-side
The B-side of the 7" single contains the song "Love Is Gonna Find You", which was also recorded by The Manhattans in 1983 for the album Forever by Your Side. It was written by the songwriters and musicians Leo Graham and Paul Richmond, and produced by Leo Graham. It was a simple song from their album that was not released as a single.

Personnel
Lead Vocal – Gerald Alston
Backing Vocals – Winfred "Blue" Lovett, Edward "Sonny" Bivins, Kenneth "Wally" Kelly
Writers: John V. Anderson, Steve Williams, Steve Horton 
Producers: John V. Anderson, Steve Williams 
Executive Producers: Morrie Brown 
Drum Programming (Linn): John V. Anderson, Steve Williams 
Drums: Leslie Ming 
Electric Bass: Wayne Brathwaite 
Electric Piano (Rhodes): John V. Anderson 
Guitar: Steve Williams 
Keyboards: John V. Anderson 
Piano: John V. Anderson 
Synthesizer (Moog): John V. Anderson

References

External links
"Crazy" Lyrics: https://genius.com/The-manhattans-crazy-lyrics on Genius.
.

1983 singles
1983 songs
1980s ballads
Soul ballads
Contemporary R&B ballads
The Manhattans songs
Columbia Records singles